The following is a list of some railway accidents, incidents and disasters in Bangladesh.

1985 

 January 13: Parbatipur-bound Simanta Express caught fire. Passengers tried to stop the train by pulling the communication cord, but the driver did not stop the train, apparently because robbers operate in the area. 27 people died and at least 58 were injured due to the accident.

1987 

 May 17: On the metre-gauge Akhaura–Laksam–Chittagong line of the Assam Bengal Railway, an express train derailed between Kamalasagar/Kasba and Nayanpur and cars rolled down to an embankment. 36 people died and 58 injured.

1989 
 January 15: A north-bound mail train collided head-on with a Chittagong-bound express train at Gazipur District, due to the railway staff not knowing how to operate the new signal system. Several cars rolled off an embankment into a rice paddy. Due to the Bishwa Ijtema religious festival at Tongi, there were over 2,000 people in total on both trains, many riding on roofs or between coaches. At least 170 died and 400 were injured.
 02/02/1989: Derailment of a passenger train near Chittagong District resulted in 13 deaths and 200 injured people.

2014 

 April 13: At around 03:20 am, a running Dhaka-bound Ekota Express collided head-on with a standing Lalmonirhat-bound Lalmoni Express at Ullapara railway station, Sirajganj District. Three coaches of Ekota Express and one coach of Lalmoni Express were mangled. A total of seven coaches veered off the tracks. At least 2 people died and 50 people were injured.
Six wagons of the train derailed and oil from three of the wagons flowed into a nearby canal. Udayan Express from Sylhet narrowly escaped a fatal accident on the route with that train.

2016 

 January 10: Locomotive of a Brahmanbaria-bound commuter train derailed at Arshinagar, Narsingdi District. 2 died and 10 injured as a result.
 September 14: At around 11:00 am, a container freight train with locomotive 2037 derailed in Faujdarhat, Chittagong. The loco driver and the assistant driver were injured.
 October 7: Locomotive no. 2933, which was one of the newest locomotives of class 2900, caught fire and derailed with several coaches of Parabat Express near Noapara railway station in Noyapara Upazila, Habiganj District. The driver cab and electrical cabinet of the locomotive were destroyed in the fire, and the locomotive had to undergo heavy repairs. No casualties happened.

2018 

 March 9: Five minutes before reaching Chandpur railway station, power car no. 8358 of Meghna Express caught fire due to overheating of the generator. The railway staffs were able to extinguish fire completely before the situation could go worse. There were no deaths but almost 30 passengers were injured for rushing with panic to get out of the train.
March 15: The connecting portion of Ga and Gha coaches of Chittagong-bound Subarna Express caught fire at about 3:30 pm in Mohakhali Amtali area near Banani railway station, Dhaka. But the reason for catching fire is not known. Later, railway workers, passengers and firefighters extinguished the fire. No casualties occurred.
 April 15: Five coaches of a train derailed at Tongi, Gazipur District. 5 died and 50 injured as a result.

2019 

June 23: At around 11:40 pm, several coaches of Dhaka-bound Upaban Express veered off the tracks after a culvert over the Barochhara Canal broke down, two-hundred yards off Baramchal railway station in Kulaura Upazila, Moulvibazar District. Two coaches fell into the canal and one overturned. At least 5 people died and hundreds were injured. See: Kulaura train accident.
 July 15: At least 10 people of a microbus were killed due to a collision with a Dhaka-bound train at an unmanned level crossing in Ullahpara Upazila, Sirajganj District.
 November 12: At around 3 am, Dhaka-bound Turna Nishita Express rammed Chittagong-bound Udayan Express at Mondobhag railway station in Kasba Upazila, Brahmanbaria District. At least 16 people died and 73 were injured. Two coaches of Udayan Express were damaged. See: Mondobhag train collision.
 November 14: At around 2 pm, a locomotive and seven coaches (including a power car) of Rangpur-bound Rangpur Express derailed at Ullapara railway station area in Sirajganj District. Fire broke out in three coaches. Nobody was killed but at least 25 passengers were injured when they hurried to get off the coaches due to the fire.

2020 

November 7: At around 04:30 am, Dhaka-bound Nilsagar Express collided with a bus stuck on a level crossing in Gazipur District. The bus got stuck with the locomotive of the train and was dragged around one or half of kilometer. 2 died and at least 5 were injured due to this accident.
December 6: At around 11 am or 12 pm near Shahjibazar railway station of Habiganj District, five wagons of a Sylhet-bound oil-carrying train from Chittagong derailed and the train fell off from the track and caught fire.

2022 

 July 27: Eleven people died in a collision between a microbus and a train in Mirsorai, Chattogram

References

Sources
 

 
Bangladesh